The Armenian Democratic Liberal Party, the Ramgavar Party, (known before 1921 as the Armenakan party), also known by its Armenian initials or its English initials ADL (meaning Armenian Democratic Liberal) is an Armenian political party in the Armenian diaspora including the Middle East, Europe, the Americas and Australia.

It was established in Constantinople in 1921 as a result of the unification of 3 political parties: the Armenakan Party, the Liberal Party of the Reformed Hunchakians, and the Constituent Democratic Party. The Armenakan Party was founded in 1885 by Mekertich Portukalian as part of the national movement in Van in the Ottoman Empire.

Following the 2003 Armenian parliamentary elections, the party won 2.9% of the popular vote, failing to win any seats. Ever since, the party has lost complete influence in the political landscape of Armenia and currently acts as an extra-parliamentary force. However, the party continues its activities throughout the Armenian diaspora, as one of the three historic traditional parties of the diaspora.

History

1885–1921: Armenakan Party

The Armenakan Party was established in Van by Mekertich Portukalian, Setrak Gabudian, and Hampig Der Hampartsoumian in 1885 as an underground organization against the ruling system. It was classified as a party based on the fact that it developed a platform, a central body, and an official publication.

The founders of the Armenakan party, Mekertich Portukalian, Setrak Gabudian, and Hampig Der Hampartsoumian kept in touch with the leaders, and published a journal of political and social enlightenment, "Armenia". Portukalian is also cited as the father of the Armenian Patriotic Society of Europe.

After Mekertich Portukalian, the Armenians of Van continued to develop the political principles behind Armenian nationalism, in secrecy. The party's main misconception was that enemies of the Ottoman Empire would intervene and rescue the Armenian people throughout the period 1885–1918.

With the turn of the century, Armenakans had cells outside Van, in other towns in the province, as well as in Trabzon and Istanbul. The military structure was developed in Russian Transcaucasia, in Persia, and in the United States. Military activities in the Ottoman Empire included Bashkaleh Resistance in May 1889, Defense of Van in June 1896 and the Siege of Van from April 19 to May 6, 1915.

1921–present: Armenian Democratic Liberal Party (ADL)
The majority of the membership of the Armenakan Party was absorbed into the new party.

Ideology
The Ramgavar party advocates liberalism and capitalism, unlike the other two classical Armenian political parties, the Social Democrat Hunchakian Party and the Armenian Revolutionary Federation, which both maintain the leftist ideologies.

The current numbers of the party are minimal compared to other traditional parties in the diaspora and Armenia. Subsequently, due to this situation a debate has been initated over the existence of the party. Party member Unger Garabed Manushian has called for reform or disbandment of the party, "We, the Ramgavars, today are at a focal point of our history. We have no presence in Armenia and insignificant role in the Diaspora. We must start a process of reforming the party, its ideology, and its activities if we want to exist in the next 10 years. If we do not choose this course, then we must admit to ourselves that our party has come to an end."

ADL Media
Armenian Democratic Liberal Party has long-established media in the Armenian diaspora as well as in Armenia.

Argentina: Sardarabad (ADL weekly newspaper in Armenian and Spanish published in Buenos Aires, Argentina) 
Armenia: Azg [note **] (ADL Daily published in Armenian in Yerevan, Armenia —recently sold to other independent owners) 
Canada: Abaka [note **] (ADL trilingual weekly published since 1975 in Montreal in Armenian, English, and French)
Egypt: Arev (ADL Daily in Armenian published in Cairo, Egypt)
Greece: Nor Ashkharh (ADL weekly in Armenian published in Athens, Greece)
Lebanon: Zartonk ADL Daily in Armenian published in Beirut, Lebanon since 1937 
United States:
Armenian Mirror-Spectator [note **] (ADL weekly published since 1932 in English in Watertown, Massachusetts) 
Baikar (ADL periodical established 1922 and published daily / weekly in various periods in Armenian in Watertown, Massachusetts)
Nor Or (ADL weekly published in Armenian in Altadena, California) 

[note **]: As a result of the rift in the party, some party organs have started actively supporting the rival Armenakan-Democratic Liberal Party and the latter's policies, most notably Azg in Armenia, Armenian Mirror-Spectator in the United States and Abaka in Canada.

Modern developments

Ramgavar Heroes and resistance against the Ottoman Empire
The party was active during and after the Armenian genocide when the Armenians began mobilising politically for rights under the oppressing Ottoman regime. A main figure in the Ramgavar party, Diran Pasha, led the resistance within the Ottoman political arena and subsequently picked up arms when the Ottoman government began the systematic annihilation of the Armenian population in Anatolia and Northeastern Turkey (Western Armenia). With his band of brothers, Zinvadz Lerner, Diran Pasha held out the Ottoman forces from the ancient castle at Haghardzin village. The siege concluded with the death of Diran and all his men.

Diran Pasha's death inspired more people to join the ranks of the Ramgavars. Agha Panos planned an attack an on Ottoman military convoy on their way to deport the Armenians of Mooghni. Later on, after the unsuccessful attack, Agha Panos, later on, was disillusioned by the Ramgavars failures and joined the ranks of the Hnchankians. During that time, the Hnchankians had an active policy against the ranks of the Ramgavars with the aim of recruiting young Ramgavars towards the ranks of the Hnchanks.

With the establishment of the First Republic of Armenia in 1918, the Ramgavar battalions disbanded over their disagreements with the Ramgavar political committees who wanted to have a more confrontational manner vis-a-vis the government in Armenia.

Expansion towards Armenia
During the Soviet reign 1921-1990 when the Communist Party was the only legal political party allowed in the Armenian Soviet Socialist Republic, all other political parties were banned, including the Armenian Democratic Liberal Party, despite the party's traditional role as, more or less, a supporter of Soviet Armenia achievements in the Armenian diaspora.

With the establishment of the independent Armenia in 1990, the Armenian Democratic Liberal Party soon established party affiliates in the new Republic commanding a good number of applicants, adherents and sympathisers. The influx of Diasporan Armenians also encouraged the propagation of the party and its right of centre ideology attracted elements in the new republic. Of immense importance was also the establishment of the highly respected and popular Azg daily, an official organ of the Armenian Liberal Democrats. The party also tried to form alliances with various political parties and movements established in the new republic.

Establishment of the Democratic Liberal Party of Armenia

Because of the status of the Armenian Democratic Liberal Party as a Diaspora organisation, and although the party had established cadres allied to it in the new republic, there were legal restrictions about being itself established as a legal political entity and participation in Armenian Parliamentary election. For this purpose, Armenia-based sympathisers of the party established in July 1991 a new nominally independent party called Democratic Liberal Party of Armenia (in Armenian Հայաստանի Ռամկավար Ազատական Կուսակցություն (ՀՌԱԿ)). Close cooperation continued between the two entities, although the political role was reserved predominantly to the new entity. Despite this, the traditional Armenian Democratic Liberal Party (in Armenian Ռամկավար Ազատական Կուսակցություն (ՌԱԿ)) continued its nominal existence.

Rift in party and establishment of Armenakan-Democratic Liberal Party
A major rift developed in the traditional Armenian Democratic Liberal Party (ADL) with a significant number of its members favouring the newly established Armenakan-Democratic Liberal Party generally considered an offshoot of the Armenian Democratic Liberal Party, but not officially recognised by the current (diaspora) leadership of the ADL. Armenakan-Democratic Liberal Party also decided to move its main office to Yerevan, Armenia, another move not approved by the current leadership of the ADL.

There are also great differences about the ownership and policies of the traditional Armenia and Diaspora media of the ADL, some of which have declared their affiliation with the new Armenakan entity, rather than the line of the current traditional leadership, whereas other party media stuck to the official party line.

The Central Executive of ADL chaired by Mike Kharabian, and in Armenia, the Democratic Liberal Party of Armenia (ADLA) chaired by Harutiun Arakelian have both expressed clear opposition and blamed the new entity of trying to divide the party. In 2008 three parties in Armenia, the National Rebirth, Dashink, and Liberal Progressive Parties dissolved into the ADLA. The last assembly of the official Armenian Democratic Liberal Party (ADL) took place in Spring 2009 in Amman, Jordan.

Harutiun Arakelian of the Democratic Liberal Party of Armenia (ADLA) has also declared that the party will challenge the adoption of the name of the new party once the latter applies for registration, due to the similarity of the names and ADLA will demand that the new party adopts a different and more distinctive name to alleviate any confusion with the ADL / ADLA.

ADL in Lebanese Politics

The Armenian Democratic Liberal Party with its centre-right politics has long been one of the three traditional ethnic Armenian parties in Lebanon alongside the Social Democrat Hunchakian Party (centre-left) and the Armenian Revolutionary Federation (left-socialist). But with stronger candidates from its rivals and certainly higher membership and political voting power in the other two, ADL never held representation in the Lebanese Parliament until the end of the 1990s.

ADL Lebanon won its first-ever parliamentary seat in 2000, as an ally to Rafik Hariri's Future Movement, when the latter opted to form alliances with ADL and the Social Democrat Hunchakian Party to the detriment of the Armenian Revolutionary Federation, the traditional political power maker of Lebanese-Armenian politics. The MP and party's leader in Lebanon Hagop Kassarjian was elected in 2000 as part of Hariri's strong Beirut list dominated by the Future Movement and re-elected in 2005 elections as part of March 14 Alliance. The Armenian Revolutionary Federation sided at the time with the opposition March 8 Alliance.

The official MP of the ADL party in the Lebanese Parliament after the 2009 elections is Jean Ogassapian as part of the same March 14 Alliance, although he is not a card-holding member of the party.

The current president of the Ramgavar party in Lebanon is Sevag Hagopian who is also the editor in chief of the Zartonk Daily, the official organ of the Ramgavar party.

See also

 Liberalism in Armenia
 List of political parties in Armenia
 Mkrtich Avetisian
 Politics of Armenia
 Programs of political parties in Armenia

References

External links
Armenian Democratic Liberal Party Facebook page
Ramgavar Mamoul website
Ramgavar Mamoul Facebook page

1885 establishments in the Ottoman Empire
Political parties established in 1921
 
Political history of Armenia
Political parties in Armenia
Political parties in Lebanon
Pro-European political parties in Armenia
Classical liberal parties